Andrew Lubahn (born September 10, 1991) is an American soccer player who currently plays for New York Cosmos in the National Independent Soccer Association.

Career

College

Professional
Lubahn played college soccer at Wake Forest University between 2010 and 2013.  Lubahn currently sits in the top 10 for goals scored at Wake Forest University.

While at college, Lubahn appeared for USL PDL clubs Michigan Bucks and Carolina Dynamo.

Lubahn signed with United Soccer League club Harrisburg City Islanders on August 8, 2015.

Lubahn moved to USL side Louisville City FC on January 28, 2016.

Lubahn moved to NASL side San Francisco Deltas and won the 2017 NASL Championship with the club.

Lubahn signed with USL Championship expansion club side Loudoun United FC on February 16, 2019. He is the fourth player Loudoun has signed in history. He was left as a free-agent after the 2019 USL season.

References

External links

 
 Wake Forest bio

1991 births
Living people
American soccer players
Association football forwards
North Carolina Fusion U23 players
Louisville City FC players
Flint City Bucks players
North American Soccer League players
Penn FC players
San Francisco Deltas players
Soccer players from Pennsylvania
Sportspeople from Erie, Pennsylvania
USL Championship players
USL League Two players
Wake Forest Demon Deacons men's soccer players
Pittsburgh Riverhounds SC players
Loudoun United FC players